Tengilaelaps is a genus of mites in the family Laelapidae.

Species
 Tengilaelaps cerambycius Gu & Wang, 1996

References

Laelapidae